Rrasa e Zogut is a mountain in Junik in Kosovo,  from the border with Albania.

Notes and references

Notes:

References:

Mountains of Kosovo
Two-thousanders of Kosovo